Gulls, or colloquially seagulls, are seabirds of the family Laridae in the suborder Lari. They are most closely related to the terns and skimmers and only distantly related to auks, and even more distantly to waders. Until the 21st century, most gulls were placed in the genus Larus, but that arrangement is now considered polyphyletic, leading to the resurrection of several genera. An older name for gulls is mews, which is cognate with German Möwe, Danish måge, Swedish mås, Dutch meeuw, Norwegian måke/måse and French mouette, and can still be found in certain regional dialects.

Gulls are typically medium to large in size, usually grey or white, often with black markings on the head or wings. They typically have harsh wailing or squawking calls; stout, longish bills; and webbed feet. Most gulls are ground-nesting carnivores which take live food or scavenge opportunistically, particularly the Larus species. Live food often includes crustaceans, molluscs, fish and small birds. Gulls have unhinging jaws which allow them to consume large prey. Gulls are typically coastal or inland species, rarely venturing far out to sea, except for the kittiwakes. The large species take up to four years to attain full adult plumage, but two years is typical for small gulls. Large white-headed gulls are typically long-lived birds, with a maximum age of 49 years recorded for the herring gull.

Gulls nest in large, densely packed, noisy colonies. They lay two or three speckled eggs in nests composed of vegetation. The young are precocial, born with dark mottled down and mobile upon hatching. Gulls are resourceful, inquisitive, and intelligent, the larger species in particular, demonstrating complex methods of communication and a highly developed social structure. For example, many gull colonies display mobbing behavior, attacking and harassing predators and other intruders. Certain species have exhibited tool-use behavior, such as the herring gull, using pieces of bread as bait with which to catch goldfish, for example. Many species of gulls have learned to coexist successfully with humans and have thrived in human habitats. Others rely on kleptoparasitism to get their food. Gulls have been observed preying on live whales, landing on the whale as it surfaces to peck out pieces of flesh.

Description and morphology

They are generally uniform in shape, with heavy bodies, long wings, and moderately long necks. The tails of all but three species are rounded; the exceptions being Sabine's gull and swallow-tailed gulls, which have forked tails, and Ross's gull, which has a wedge-shaped tail. Gulls have moderately long legs, especially when compared to the similar terns, with fully webbed feet. The bill is generally heavy and slightly hooked, with the larger species having stouter bills than the smaller species. The bill colour is often yellow with a red spot for the larger white-headed species and red, dark red or black in the smaller species.

The gulls are generalist feeders. Indeed, they are the least specialised of all the seabirds, and their morphology allows for equal adeptness in swimming, flying, and walking. They are more adept walking on land than most other seabirds, and the smaller gulls tend to be more manoeuvrable while walking. The walking gait of gulls includes a slight side to side motion, something that can be exaggerated in breeding displays. In the air, they are able to hover and they are also able to take off quickly with little space.

The general pattern of plumage in adult gulls is a white body with a darker mantle; the extent to which the mantle is darker varies from pale grey to black. A few species vary in this, the ivory gull is entirely white, and some like the lava gull and Heermann's gull have partly or entirely grey bodies. The wingtips of most species are black, which improves their resistance to wear and tear, usually with a diagnostic pattern of white markings. The head of a gull may be covered by a dark hood or be entirely white. The plumage of the head varies by breeding season; in nonbreeding dark-hooded gulls, the hood is lost, sometimes leaving a single spot behind the eye, and in white-headed gulls, nonbreeding heads may have streaking.

Distribution and habitat

The gulls have a worldwide cosmopolitan distribution. They breed on every continent, including the margins of Antarctica, and are found in the high Arctic as well. They are less common on tropical islands, although a few species do live on islands such as the Galapagos and New Caledonia. Many species breed in coastal colonies, with a preference for islands, and one species, the grey gull, breeds in the interior of dry deserts far from water. Considerable variety exists in the family and species may breed and feed in marine, freshwater, or terrestrial habitats.

Most gull species are migratory, with birds moving to warmer habitats during the winter, but the extent to which they migrate varies by species. Some migrate long distances, like Franklin's gull, which migrates from Canada to wintering grounds in the south of South America. Other species move much shorter distances and may simply disperse along the coasts near their breeding sites.

A big influence on non-breeding gull distribution are food patches. Human fisheries especially have an impact since they often provide an abundant and predictable food resource. Looking at two species of gulls dependent on human fisheries, Audouin (Ichthyaetus audouinii) and black-backed gulls (Larus fuscus), their breeding distributions (especially the black-backed gull) was heavily impacted by human fishing discards and fishing ports.

Looking further at environmental drivers that structure bird habitat and distribution are human and climate impacts. Looking at waterbird distribution in wetlands, changes in salinity, water depth, water body isolation and hydroperiod altered bird community structure in both a species and guild specific way. Gulls in particular had high associations with salinity levels, being the main environmental predictor for waterbird assemblage.

Behaviour

Diet and feeding
Charadriiform birds drink salt water, as well as fresh water, as they possess exocrine glands located in supraorbital grooves of the skull by which salt can be excreted through the nostrils to assist the kidneys in maintaining electrolyte balance.
Gulls are highly adaptable feeders that opportunistically take a wide range of prey. The food taken by gulls includes fish and marine and freshwater invertebrates, both alive and already dead; terrestrial arthropods and invertebrates such as insects and earthworms; rodents, eggs, carrion, offal, reptiles, amphibians, seeds, fruit, human refuse, and even other birds. No gull species is a single-prey specialist, and no gull species forages using only a single method. The type of food depends on circumstances, and terrestrial prey such as seeds, fruit, and earthworms are more common during the breeding season while marine prey is more common in the nonbreeding season when birds spend more time on large bodies of water.

In addition to taking a wide range of prey, gulls display great versatility in how they obtain prey. Prey can be obtained in the air, on water, or on land. In the air, a number of hooded species are able to hawk insects on the wing; larger species perform this feat more rarely. Gulls on the wing also snatch items both off water and off the ground, and over water they also plunge-dive to catch prey. Again, smaller species are more manoeuvrable and better able to hover-dip fish from the air. Dipping is also common when birds are sitting on the water, and gulls may swim in tight circles or foot paddle to bring marine invertebrates up to the surface. Food is also obtained by searching the ground, often on the shore among sand, mud or rocks. Larger gulls tend to do more feeding in this way. In shallow water gulls may also engage in foot paddling. One method of obtaining prey involves dropping heavy shells of clams and mussels onto hard surfaces. Gulls may fly some distance to find a suitable surface on which to drop shells, and apparently a learned component to the task exists, as older birds are more successful than younger ones. While overall feeding success is a function of age, the diversity in both prey and feeding methods is not. The time taken to learn foraging skills may explain the delayed maturation in gulls.

Gulls have only a limited ability to dive below the water to feed on deeper prey. To obtain prey from deeper down, many species of gulls feed in association with other animals, where marine hunters drive prey to the surface when hunting. Examples of such associations include four species of gulls feeding around plumes of mud brought to the surface by feeding grey whales, and also between orcas (largest dolphin species) and kelp gulls (and other seabirds).

Looking at the effect of humans on gull diet, overfishing of target prey such as sardines have caused a shift in diet and behavior. Analysis of yellow-legged gull's (Larus michahellis) pellets off the northwest coast of Spain revealed a shift from a sardine to crustacean-based diet. This shift was linked to higher fishing efficiency and thus overall fish stock depletion. Lastly, closure of nearby open-air landfills limited food availability for the gulls, furthering creating a stress on their shift in diet. Between the years of 1974–1994, yellow-legged gull populations in Berlenga Island, Portugal, increased from 2600 to 44,698 individuals. Analyzing both adult and chick remains, researchers found a mixture of both natural prey and human refuse. The gulls relied substantially on the Henslow's swimming crab (Polybius henslowii). Yet, in times when local prey availability is low, the gulls shift to human-related food. These temporal shifts from a marine to terrestrial prey highlight the resilience adult gulls have and their ability to keep chick condition consistent. Human disturbance has also shown to have an effect on gull breeding, in which hatching failure is directly proportional to the amount of disturbance in a given plot. Certain gull breeds have been known to feast on the eye balls of baby seals, and directly pilfer milk from the elephant seal's teat.

Breeding

Gulls are monogamous and colonial breeders that display mate fidelity that usually lasts for the life of the pair. Divorce of mated pairs does occur, but it apparently has a social cost that persists for a number of years after the break-up. Gulls also display high levels of site fidelity, returning to the same colony after breeding there once and even usually breeding in the same location within that colony. Colonies can vary from just a few pairs to over a hundred thousand pairs, and may be exclusive to that gull species or shared with other seabird species. A few species nest singly, and single pairs of band-tailed gulls may breed in colonies of other birds. Within colonies, gull pairs are territorial, defending an area of varying size around the nesting site from others of their species. This area can be as large as a 5-m radius around the nest in the herring gull to just a tiny area of cliff ledge in the kittiwakes.

Most gulls breed once a year and have predictable breeding seasons lasting for three to five months. Gulls begin to assemble around the colony for a few weeks prior to occupying the colony. Existing pairs re-establish their pair-bonds, and unpaired birds begin courting. Birds then move back into their territories and new males establish new territories and attempt to court females. Gulls defend their territories from rivals of both sexes through calls and aerial attacks.

Nest building is also part of the pair-bonding. Gull nests are usually mats of herbaceous matter with a central nest cup. Nests are usually built on the ground, but a few species build nests on cliffs, including the kittiwakes, which almost always nest in such habitats, and in some cases in trees, and high places like Bonaparte's gulls. Species that nest in marshes must construct a nesting platform to keep the nest dry, particularly in species that nest in tidal marshes. Both sexes gather nesting material and build the nest, but the division of labour is not always exactly equal. In coastal towns, many gulls nest on rooftops and can be observed by nearby human residents.

Clutch size is typically three eggs, although it is two in some of the smaller species and only one egg for the swallow-tailed gull. Within colonies, birds synchronise their laying, with synchronisation being higher in larger colonies, although after a certain point, this levels off. The eggs of gulls are usually dark tan to brown or dark olive with dark splotches and scrawl markings, and are well camouflaged. Both sexes incubate the eggs, with incubation bouts lasting between one and four hours during the day and one parent incubating through the night. Research on various bird species including the gull suggests that females form pair bonds with other females to obtain alloparental care for their dependent offspring, a behavior seen in other animal species, like the elephants, wolves, and the fathead minnow.

Incubation lasts between 22 and 26 days, and begins after laying the first egg, although it is discontinuous until the second egg is laid. This means the first two chicks are born close together, and the third chick some time later. Young chicks are brooded by their parents for about one or two weeks, and often at least one parent remains with them, until they fledge, to guard them. Both parents feed the chicks, although early on in the rearing period, the male does most of the feeding and the female most of the brooding and guarding.

Taxonomy
The family Laridae was introduced (as Laridia) by the French polymath Constantine Samuel Rafinesque in 1815. The taxonomy of gulls is confused by their widespread distribution zones of hybridization leading to geneflow. Some have traditionally been considered ring species, but recent evidence suggests that this assumption is questionable. Until recently, most gulls were placed in the genus Larus, but this arrangement is now known to be polyphyletic, leading to the resurrection of the genera Ichthyaetus, Chroicocephalus, Leucophaeus, Saundersilarus, and Hydrocoloeus. Some English names refer to species complexes within the group:

 Large white-headed gull is used to describe the 18 or so herring gull-like species from California gull to lesser black-backed gull in the taxonomic list below.
 White-winged gull is used to describe the four pale-winged, high Arctic-breeding taxa within the former group; these are Iceland gull, glaucous gull, Thayer's gull, and Kumlien's gull.

In common usage, members of various gull species are often referred to as sea gulls or seagulls; however, "seagull" is a layperson's term that is not used by most ornithologists and biologists. This name is used informally to refer to a common local species or all gulls in general, and has no fixed taxonomic meaning. In common usage, gull-like seabirds that are not technically gulls (e.g. albatrosses, fulmars, terns, and skuas) may also be referred to as seagulls by the layperson.

The American Ornithologists' Union combines the Sternidae, Stercorariidae, and Rhynchopidae as subfamilies in the family Laridae, but recent research indicates this is incorrect.

A molecular phylogenetic study published in 2022 found the following relationships between the genera. Some authorities place the Saunders's gull in its own genus Saundersilarus.

List of species
This is a list of the 54 gull species, presented in taxonomic sequence.

Evolutionary history
The Laridae are known from not-yet-published fossil evidence since the Early Oligocene, some 30–33 million years ago. Three gull-like species were described by Alphonse Milne-Edwards from the early Miocene of Saint-Gérand-le-Puy, France. A fossil gull from the Middle to Late Miocene of Cherry County, Nebraska, USA, is placed in the prehistoric genus Gaviota; apart from this and the undescribed Early Oligocene fossil, all prehistoric species were tentatively assigned to the modern genus Larus. Among those of them that have been confirmed as gulls, Milne-Edwards' "Larus" elegans and "L." totanoides from the Late Oligocene/Early Miocene of southeast France have since been separated in Laricola.

References

Further reading

External links 

 Rudy's Gull-index Pictures of less well-known plumages of large gulls
 Gull videos on the Internet Bird Collection

Articles containing video clips
Bird common names
Laridae
Seabirds